Kolonia Lubeckiego (English: Lubecki Colony) is a historical housing estate in the Ochota district of Warsaw, Poland, bordered by the streets Fitrowa, Krzywickiego, Wawelska, Grójecka and Plac Narutowicza. The area is characterized by houses built during the interwar period, with many trees and green spaces.

History 
The local council had originally planned to build a park on the site, however it was later agreed the area was more suitable as a residential area to accommodate the growing number of people working in the city center.

Construction began in 1924, with the first buildings designed by several architects including Antoni Jawornicki, Aleksander Sygietyński, Wacław Weker and Teofil Wiśniowski, in the neoclassical style. By the 1930s, however, a more modernist style was incorporated into the estates design.
During the Warsaw Uprising, between August 4 and 25, 1944, residents of the estate were embroiled in the so-called Ochota massacre, a series of mass murders, robberies and other crimes perpetrated primarily by the S.S. Sturmbrigade R.O.N.A., an anti-partisan group from Russia. An estimated 10,000 Ochota residents were murdered during this period.

Bibliography 

 Jarosław Zieliński, Z dziejów Ochoty: Kolonia Lubeckiego (1), Ochotnik nr 11 02/2006 ISSN 1734-5510
 Jarosław Zieliński, Z dziejów Ochoty: Kolonia Lubeckiego (2), Ochotnik nr 12 03/2006 ISSN 1734-5510
 Kolonia Lubeckiego w Spacerowniku Gazety Wyborczej

Neighbourhoods of Ochota